This is the complete list of Asian Games medalists in shooting from 1954 to 2018.

Men

Pistol

10 m air pistol
 From 1974 to 1982, open to both genders

10 m air pistol team
 From 1974 to 1982, open to both genders

25 m center fire pistol
 From 1966 to 1982, open to both genders

25 m center fire pistol team
 From 1966 to 1982, open to both genders

25 m rapid fire pistol
 From 1954 to 1982, open to both genders
 In 1966, 30 m rapid fire pistol

25 m rapid fire pistol team
 From 1966 to 1982, open to both genders
 In 1966, 30 m rapid fire pistol

25 m standard pistol
 From 1974 to 1982, open to both genders

25 m standard pistol team
 From 1974 to 1982, open to both genders

50 m pistol
 From 1954 to 1982, open to both genders

50 m pistol team
 From 1966 to 1982, open to both genders

Rifle

10 m air rifle
 From 1966 to 1982, open to both genders

10 m air rifle team
 From 1966 to 1982, open to both genders

50 m rifle prone
 From 1954 to 1982, open to both genders

50 m rifle prone team
 From 1966 to 1982, open to both genders

50 m rifle kneeling

50 m rifle standing

50 m rifle 3 positions
 From 1954 to 1982, open to both genders

50 m rifle 3 positions team
 From 1966 to 1982, open to both genders

50 m standard rifle 3 positions
 From 1966 to 1982, open to both genders

50 m standard rifle 3 positions team
 From 1966 to 1982, open to both genders

300 m rifle 3 positions
 From 1954 to 1962, open to both genders

300 m standard rifle

Running target

10 m running target

10 m running target team

10 m running target mixed

10 m running target mixed team

50 m running target

50 m running target team

50 m running target mixed

50 m running target mixed team

Shotgun

Trap
 From 1954 to 1986, open to both genders

Trap team
 From 1974 to 1986, open to both genders

Double trap

Double trap team

Skeet
 From 1974 to 1986, open to both genders

Skeet team
 From 1974 to 1986, open to both genders

Women

Pistol

10 m air pistol

10 m air pistol team

25 m pistol

25 m pistol team

Rifle

10 m air rifle

10 m air rifle team

50 m rifle prone

50 m rifle prone team

50 m rifle 3 positions

50 m rifle 3 positions team

Running target

10 m running target

10 m running target team

Shotgun

Trap

Trap team

Double trap

Double trap team

Skeet

Skeet team

Mixed

Pistol

10 m air pistol team

Rifle

10 m air rifle team

Shotgun

Trap team

References 

Medalists from previous Asian Games – Men – Team – Rifle
Medalists from previous Asian Games – Men – Team – Discontinued events

External links
Asian Shooting Federation

Shooting
medalists